Mulaha is an extinct language of the "Bird's Tail" of Papua New Guinea. A word list was collected by English (1902).

References

Languages of Papua New Guinea
Extinct languages of Oceania
Kwalean languages